Beauty and the Geek is a reality television franchise that first aired in the United States.

International versions
 Currently airing franchise
 Franchise no longer in production

In Brazil, the original American show aired on the cable television network Multishow under the title As Gostosas e os Geeks (The Hotties and the Geeks).

References

Banijay franchises
Reality television series franchises